John Altman may refer to:
John Altman (actor) (born 1952), English actor and singer
John Altman (composer) (born 1949), English film composer, music arranger, orchestrator and conductor
John Altman (author) (born 1969), American thriller writer